The 2022 COSAFA Under-17 Championship was the 11th edition of the COSAFA U-17 Championship, a football tournament organized by the Council of Southern Africa Football Associations (COSAFA) involving teams from Southern Africa for players aged 17 and below. Malawi was the host of tournament from 2–11 December 2022.

Angola was the defending champion, by defeating Zambia 2–1 in the final on 7 December 2021.

Participating nations
The following seven teams are contesting in the tournament.

Venue
All matches were played at these ground in Malawi.

Draw
The draw for the tournament were held on 4 November 2022 at Lilongwe, Malawi. The seven teams were divided into two group. Top two teams from each group will enter to the Semi-finals

Group summary

Group stages

Group A

Group B

Knockout stage
In the knockout stage, extra-time and a penalty shoot-out will be used to decide the winner if necessary.

Bracket

Semi-finals

Third place match

Final

Awards

Statistics

Goalscorers

References

COSAFA Under-17 Championship
International association football competitions hosted by South Africa
2022 in African football
COSAFA
COSAFA